Margaret Matilda White (9 January 1868 – 6 July 1910) was a New Zealand photographer and nurse. Her best known works are photographs she took at the Auckland Mental Hospital. A collection of her glass plates is held by the Auckland War Memorial Museum.

Biography
White was born in Belfast, Northern Ireland and emigrated to New Zealand with her family in 1886. From 1890 she worked with New Zealand photographer John Hanna in his studio. She later established her own photographic studio in Newton, Auckland. However this venture was not a success and she was forced to close her business. Despite this failure she continued to take photographs up until her death. After the closure of her studio she worked as a nurse at the Auckland Mental Hospital in Avondale. It was while working there that she took a series of photographs for which she is best known.

She died at Waihi hospital on 6 July 1910. Auckland War Memorial Museum holds a large collection of White's photographic glass plates.

References

1868 births
1910 deaths
19th-century New Zealand photographers
New Zealand women photographers
People from Auckland
New Zealand nurses
20th-century New Zealand photographers
19th-century women photographers
20th-century women photographers